Enoch Armani Tolbert (born September 25, 1996), known professionally as Armani White, is an American rapper. His song "Billie Eilish" peaked at number 58 on the Billboard Hot 100 in September 2022.

Early life
White has been surrounded during his childhood by a family that played music which drew his attention towards music. He started rapping in the second grade. He attended Delaware State University.

Career 
White released his debut album Keep in Touch in 2019, which he says was inspired from the time spent with his father.

Personal life
When White was 19, his father was diagnosed with prostate cancer.

Discography

Albums

Extended plays

Charting singles

Other singles
 "The Knowing 2" (2012)
 "NYC Window" (2017)
 "Public School" (2018)
 "Casablanco Freestyle" (2018)
 "Onederful" (2018)
 "Secret Handshake" (2019)
 "Stick Up" (2019)
 "Flip" (2019)
 "Touché" (2019)
 "Black Oak Park" (2019)
 "2maro" (2019)
 "Love, Dad" (2019)
 "Thanksgiving" (2019)
 "Letter From Jail" (2020)
 "Danny Mac" (2020)
 "Grateful" (2021)
 "Diamond Dallas" (2022)
 "Bazigaar W/ Divine (2022)
"Goated" (featuring Denzel Curry) (2023)

References

1996 births
Living people
21st-century American rappers
American hip hop singers
Rappers from Philadelphia